Sauer 100 is a bolt-action rifle manufactured by Sauer & Sohn that was launched in 2016. It is an entry level rifle from Sauer, and is produced on the same factory and shares many parts with Mauser M18.

Technical 
The stock comes with a proprietary bedding called "Ever-Rest" which consists of a metal block around the front action screw. The rifle is available in many variants, such as:

 Atacama
 Ceratech
 Cherokee
 Fieldshoot
 Pantera

The action has a very similar outer profile to the Remington 700 enabling it to accept standard Remington 700 pattern scope mounts. The trigger has one stage, with an adjustable weight between 1000 and 2000 grams (2.2 to 4.4 lbs).

The bolt has 3 locking lugs and a 60 degree bolt throw. The lugs neither locks into the action or the barrel, but instead locks into a breech ring mounted between the barrel and action. The barrel is mounted to the receiver with action threads and is not a press fit like other Sauer models. The barrel can be delivered from factory with M15x1 muzzle threads, while M14x1 and 1/2"-28 threads are available by order).

See also 
 Sauer 90
 Sauer 101
 Sauer 200
 Sauer 202
 Sauer 303
 Sauer 404

References

External links 
 Sauer 100 Classic at J. P. Sauer & Sohn

Rifles of Germany